The 39th General Assembly of Nova Scotia represented Nova Scotia between October 1, 1928, to July 13, 1933.

Gordon Sidney Harrington became premier in 1930 after E. N. Rhodes entered the federal cabinet.

Division of seats

There were 43 members of the General Assembly, elected in the 1928 Nova Scotia general election.

List of members

Former members of the 39th General Assembly

References 

38
1928 establishments in Nova Scotia
1933 disestablishments in Nova Scotia
20th century in Nova Scotia